Askariyeh may refer to:
 Askariyeh, Razavi Khorasan
 Askariyeh, Yazd
 Askariyeh, Taft, Yazd Province

See also
Asgariyeh
Askari (disambiguation)
Askar (disambiguation)